Stefan Baumeister (born 18 April 1993) is a German snowboarder, specializing in Alpine snowboarding.

Baumeister competed at the 2014 Winter Olympics for Germany. He placed 20th in qualifying for the parallel giant slalom, not advancing. In the parallel slalom, he finished 14th in qualifying. In the first elimination round, he was beaten by Austria's Lukas Mathies, finishing 14th overall.

As of September 2014, his best showing at the World Championships is 23rd, in the 2013 parallel slalom.

Baumeister made his World Cup debut in February 2010. As of September 2014, his best finish is 8th, in a parallel slalom at Bad Gastein in 2013–14. His best overall finish is 25th, in 2013–14.

References

External links

1993 births
Living people
Olympic snowboarders of Germany
Snowboarders at the 2014 Winter Olympics
Snowboarders at the 2018 Winter Olympics
Snowboarders at the 2022 Winter Olympics
People from Bad Aibling
Sportspeople from Upper Bavaria
German male snowboarders
21st-century German people